Cecilia Pérez Flores is a Mexican triathlete.

She qualified for the 2016 Olympics.  Her presence helped establish a Mexican record for qualifier in triathlon at the Olympics. She later qualified for the 2020 Olympics, and she finished 33rd.

References

Living people
Mexican female triathletes
Olympic triathletes of Mexico
Sportspeople from Guadalajara, Jalisco
Place of birth missing (living people)
Triathletes at the 2016 Summer Olympics
Triathletes at the 2019 Pan American Games
Pan American Games medalists in triathlon
Pan American Games bronze medalists for Mexico
Medalists at the 2019 Pan American Games
Triathletes at the 2020 Summer Olympics
1991 births
21st-century Mexican women